Clewer is a town in the Emalahleni Local Municipality, Nkangala District Municipality in the Mpumalanga Province of South Africa. It is located near Kendal Power Station, surrounded by the farmstead of Tweefontein and the mountain of Doornrug.

As of the 2011 census, Clewer had 1,487 households.

See also
 List of populated places in South Africa

References 

Populated places in the Emalahleni Local Municipality, Mpumalanga